Veronica Marie Zepeda Cashman (born June 11, 1982) is an American-Mexican former soccer and futsal player who played as a forward. She appeared in friendly matches for both the United States and Mexico women's national teams during her career.

Playing career

High school and college
Zepeda Cashman played for the Jurupa Valley Jaguars in high school, where she was a two-time Parade High School All-American. In college, she played for the Santa Clara Broncos, winning the 2001 NCAA Division I Women's Soccer Tournament with the school. Though she dealt with injuries throughout her college career, she was named a Third-Team All-American in 2001, and was included in the NCAA All-Tournament Team in 2001 and 2002. She was also named WCC Freshman of the Year and the school's Rookie of the Year in 2000, and was selected in the All-West Region First Team in 2001 and Second Team in 2000. She was included in the All-WCC First Team in 2000 and 2001, and Second Team in 2002. During her collegiate career, she made 83 appearances for Santa Clara, scoring 27 goals and recording 24 assists.

In 2015, Zepeda Cashman was selected to the CIF 100th Anniversary Winter All-Century Team.

Club
Zepeda Cashman played for the Claremont Stars club team.

International
Zepeda Cashman made her international debut for the United States on December 16, 1998 in a friendly match against Ukraine. In total, she made five appearances for the U.S. and scored two goals, earning her final cap on July 7, 2000 in a friendly match against Italy.

Through her parents, she was also eligible to represent Mexico internationally. She made her international debut for the team on July 8, 2004 in a 1–2 friendly loss against Australia, in preparation for the 2004 Summer Olympics. She earned her second and final cap three days later against the same opponent, which finished as a 2–0 win.

Futsal
Zepeda Cashman later played futsal and was part of the United States team which won the 2017 Women's Futsal World Cup in Spain, which was organized by the International Futsal Alliance.

Coaching career
She serves as the coach of the various girls' youth teams of Santa Clara Sporting, where she was chosen as the club's coach of the year in 2014.

Personal life
Zepeda Cashman was born in Corona, California, though Riverside is her hometown, and was born to Mexican parents. She is married, having taken the married name of Cashman.

Career statistics

International

International goals

Notes

References

Jurupa Valley, California
1982 births
Living people
Sportspeople from Corona, California
Soccer players from California
American women's soccer players
American women's soccer coaches
United States women's international soccer players
American women's futsal players
Citizens of Mexico through descent
Mexican women's footballers
Mexico women's international footballers
American sportspeople of Mexican descent
Dual internationalists (women's football)
Women's association football forwards
Parade High School All-Americans (girls' soccer)
Santa Clara Broncos women's soccer players
Sportspeople from Riverside, California